Chapakot is a municipality in the southeastern part of Syangja District in Gandaki Province of central Nepal. The new municipality was formed by merging three existing villages—Ratnapur, Kuwakot and Chapakot—on 18 May 2014. In 12 March 2017 The government implemented the new local administrative structure consisting of 744 local units. With the implementation of this new local administrative structure, the old structure will no longer be in existence. According to the new structure, VDCs  will be replaced with village councils. Newly merged VDCs are Sankhar, Sekham, Ward no. 8 of Pakbadi & Ward no. (1-3, 5-9) of Malyangkot.  The office of the municipality is that of the former Chapakot Municipality.

Population
At the time of the 2011 Nepal Census Chapakot village had a population of 4,702 people living in 1087 individual households. But now had a total population of 12,742 people living in 2,902 individual households when Ratnapur and Kuwakot VDCs merged with Chapakot. Now 26,042 peoples are living in an area of 120.59 km2. It is on a plain surrounded by hills. To the east of Chapakot is Tanahun; to the west is Galyang. The Kali Gandaki divides it from Palpa District to the south, and to the north is Waling, Biruwa & Harinas.

References

Populated places in Syangja District
Municipalities of Syangja District
Syangja District
Municipalities in Gandaki Province